"The Sounds of Eden" was an American television play broadcast live on October 15, 1959, as part of the CBS television series, Playhouse 90.  It was the second episode of the fourth season of Playhouse 90 and the 119th episode overall.

Plot
The kidnapping of a wealthy Texas oil man is depicted in a "semi-documentary" style from differing points of view. After the ransom is paid and the oil man is freed, he provides clues to assist investigators in locating the kidnappers. The play was loosely based on the kidnapping of Charles F. Urschel.

Production
John Houseman was the producer, and Buzz Kulik was the director. George Bellak wrote the teleplay.

The cast consisted of James Whitmore as Phillip Anderson (a Texas oil man), Kim Hunter as Mrs. Anderson, Henry Jones as Jess Brown, Everett Sloane as Lawson, Martin Landau as MacCormick, and Dick Foran as Brady.

Reception
In The New York Times, John P. Shanley called it "skillfully produced," "effectively acted", and "an absorbing account".

References

1959 American television episodes
Playhouse 90 (season 4) episodes
1959 television plays